Rossana Morabito (born 21 September 1969) is an Italian female retired sprinter (400 m) and middle-distance runner (800 m), who competed at the 1987 World Championships in Athletics.

Biography
At just 19 years old, Rosanna was selected for the absolute world championship. Despite being part of the junior category, she went onto win four absolute national titles. However, due to a serious injury, her sporting career ended prematurely.

Achievements

National titles
She won four times the national championships at senior level.

Italian Athletics Championships
400 metres: 1988, 1989
Italian Athletics Indoor Championships
800 metres: 1989, 1990

References

External links
 
 Rossana Morabito at All-Athletics

1969 births
Living people
Italian female sprinters
Italian female middle-distance runners
World Athletics Championships athletes for Italy
20th-century Italian women
21st-century Italian women